"Cities" is a single, released in 1980, by the American new wave band Talking Heads. It is the fourth track on the 1979 album Fear of Music.

Song style
"Cities" is a fast-paced bass and keyboard-led song. Tina Weymouth's bass playing in the song is described by AllMusic as both "melodic" and "funky", while David Byrne's guitar is said to be jittery, but clean-sounding. The song fades both in and out with a very aggressive funky rhythm and the fade-out serves as a build-up to the next song on the album, "Life During Wartime".

Lyrics
The song's meaning is simple: it is mainly about a man looking for a city to live in, though lead singer Byrne's surrealistic yet humorous delivery of the song is anything but simple. The lyrics are both deadpan and silly causing a mixed humor in the song. This combination can be seen in lyrics such as "Did I forget to mention, forget to mention Memphis, home of Elvis and the ancient Greeks."

Personnel 
Sources:
David Byrne – lead vocals, guitar
Jerry Harrison – guitar, backing vocals, keyboards
Tina Weymouth – bass guitar, backing vocals
Chris Frantz – drums
Brian Eno – electronic treatments

Other versions
The rock band Phish covered "Cities" on their 1997 album Slip, Stitch and Pass and it has been played frequently at their concerts.

Track listing
7" release
 "Cities" – 4:10
 "Cities" – (live version)

12" release
 "Cities" – 4:10
 "Cities" – (live version)
 "Artists Only" – 3:36

References

1980 singles
Talking Heads songs
Songs written by David Byrne
Sire Records singles
Song recordings produced by David Byrne
Song recordings produced by Brian Eno
1979 songs
Songs about cities